RS7 or RS-7 may refer to:

 Audi RS 7, a 2013–present German performance executive car
 Baojun RS-7, a 2020–present Chinese mid-size SUV
 Raheem Sterling, footballer for Manchester City and England